The 1908 Sheffield Central by-election was held on 21 April 1908.  The by-election was held due to the death of the incumbent Conservative MP, Howard Vincent.  It was won by the Conservative candidate James Hope.  He was unopposed.

References

Sheffield Central by-election
Sheffield Central by-election
20th century in Sheffield
Sheffield Central by-election
By-elections to the Parliament of the United Kingdom in Sheffield constituencies
Unopposed by-elections to the Parliament of the United Kingdom in English constituencies